Anaclileia is a genus of flies belonging to the family Mycetophilidae.

The species of this genus are found in Europe and Northern America.

Species
Anaclileia adjarica Kuirina, 2018
†Anaclileia anacliniformis Meunier, 1904
Anaclileia beshovskii Bechev, 1990
Anaclileia dispar (Winnertz, 1863)
†Anaclileia dissimilis Meunier, 1904
Anaclileia dziedzickii (Landrock, 1911)
†Anaclileia gazagnairei Meunier, 1904
Anaclileia nepalensis Bechev, 1990
Anaclileia splendida Zaitzev, 1994
†Anaclileia sylvatica Meunier, 1904
Anaclileia vallis Coher, 1995
Anaclileia vockerothi Bechev, 1990
Anaclileia winchesteri Coher, 1995

References

Mycetophilidae